Žermanice is a municipality and village in Frýdek-Místek District in the Moravian-Silesian Region of the Czech Republic. It has about 300 inhabitants.

Geography
It lies in the historical region of Cieszyn Silesia, in the western part of the Moravian-Silesian Foothills.

The municipality is situated on the banks of the Lučina River and on the shore of Žermanice Dam, which was built in 1951–1958, but lies just outside the municipal territory.

Žermanický lom Nature Monument is a protected  large wetland ecosystem where several species of critically endangered plants grow.

History
The village could have been founded by Benedictine monks from the Orlová monastery and was first mentioned in 1450 as Zilmanicze.

In 1461, it was owned by Jan Hunt of Kornice, the owner of neighbouring Horní Bludovice. In 1483, the village was inherited by his two sons. Before the end of the 15th century, it was bought by Jan Trnka of Racibórz, a tenant of Frýdek, who then bestowed the village upon the town. Hence, as a property of Frýdek, it was as a special case a part of the Frýdek state country that was split from the Duchy of Teschen in 1573, which was a part of the Kingdom of Bohemia, since 1526 a part of the Habsburg monarchy. After World War I and fall of Austria-Hungary it became a part of Czechoslovakia.

Sights
The Chapel of the Nativity of the Virgin Mary was built in 1843–1848.

References

External links

Villages in Frýdek-Místek District
Cieszyn Silesia